MNRA may refer to:

 Authentic Nationalist Revolutionary Movement, a small right-wing political party in Bolivia
 Revolutionary Nationalist Movement-Alliance